The Turkish Atomic Energy Authority ( - TAEK) is the official nuclear energy institution of Turkey. The headquarters is located in Ankara since 1956, the year it was founded. Among its objectives are high level of academic research in nuclear energy, development and implementation of peaceful nuclear tools.

See also
 ANAEM Ankara Nuclear Research and Training Center
 ÇNAEM Çekmece Nuclear Research and Training Center
 SANAEM Sarayköy Nuclear Research and Training Center

External links
 Official website

Nuclear research institutes
Research institutes in Turkey
Organizations based in Ankara
Research institutes established in 1956
Nuclear technology in Turkey
1956 establishments in Turkey
Government agencies established in 1956